Windward Community College is a public community college in Kāneohe, Hawaii. It is part of the University of Hawaii system and accredited by the Accrediting Commission for Community and Junior Colleges.

Created in 1972, Windward Community College primarily serves the windward Oahu region, offering college courses, non-credit classes, and community activities, including an annual Hoolaulea, typically held in September or October.

Windward CC's strengths are in Hawaiian studies, natural sciences, fine arts, veterinary technology, and vocational training. Most of its students are from the windward side of Oahu and transfer to four-year colleges, including the University of Hawaii at Mānoa and Hawaii Pacific University. Key facilities include Palikū Theatre, Hōkūlani Imaginarium (a full-dome planetarium), Aerospace Exploration Lab (a hands-on physical science exploratorium), Lanihuli Observatory, Gallery ʻIolani (an art gallery), and a Library Learning Commons that opened in 2012.

Campus

The campus features the 1998 granite and cast stone sculpture Kulia I Ka Nuu (Striving for the Summit) by Donald Harvey.

References

External links
 Official website

Education in Honolulu County, Hawaii
Community colleges in Hawaii
University of Hawaiʻi
Educational institutions established in 1972
Schools accredited by the Western Association of Schools and Colleges
1972 establishments in Hawaii